Lodge Wood and Sandford Mill is a  biological Site of Special Scientific Interest  east of Woodley in Berkshire.

This site consists of two small wet woodlands bordering the River Loddon.

History

Lodge Wood is first shown on John Rocque's map of Berkshire in 1761. In 1953 part of the site was included in the Loddon Valley SSSI.

Flora

The site has the following Flora:

Trees

Cornus
Fraxinus
Sambucus
Quercus robur
Hazel
Alder
Salix fragilis
Prunus spinosa
Ribes sylvestre
Crataegus
Euonymus

Plants

Leucojum aestivum (the Loddon Lily)
Urtica dioica
Galium aparine
Glechoma hederacea
Primula vulgaris
Anemone nemorosa
Mercurialis perennis
Ranunculus ficaria
Caltha palustris
Adoxa moschatellina
Hyacinthoides non-scripta
Narcissus pseudonarcissus

References

Sites of Special Scientific Interest in Berkshire